Free Ilocos was a state in Northern Luzon which was declared independent by revolutionary Diego Silang in December 14, 1762. Villa Fernandina (now Vigan) was designated as the capital of the independent state. Diego Silang led a revolt to liberate Ilocos from Spanish colonial rule taking advantage of the Spanish colonial government's momentary loss due to the British occupation of Manila. Diego Silang accepted an offer of protection and friendship sent by the British Governor of Manila, Dawsonne Drake, on September 24, 1762. Free Ilocos was effectively disestablished upon Diego Silang's assassination in 1763.

References

British invasion of Manila
Seven Years' War
18th century in the Philippines
1760s in Asia
History of Ilocos Norte
History of Ilocos Sur
History of Abra (province)
Proposed countries